The Amazing Race Australia 1 is the first season of the Australian reality television game show The Amazing Race Australia, the Australian version of The Amazing Race. The show was produced by activeTV Australia.

The show premiered on Australia's Seven Network on 16 May 2011 at 8:30 p.m. The season finale was aired on 1 August 2011.

Best friends and surfers Tyler Atkins and Nathan Jolliffe were the winners of this season.

Production

Filming and Development

Filming began on 5 November 2010 at the Melbourne Cricket Ground in Melbourne. The season travelled across four continents, 11 countries and 23 cities. Some of the countries visited during the series include Indonesia and Israel. Indonesia was later visited in the nineteenth series of the original American version in October 2011, while Israel has never been visited by other version of The Amazing Race outside of Israel's own version.

During the Vietnam leg, all route markers were coloured yellow and green instead of yellow and red. This was done to avoid confusion with the former South Vietnamese national flag, which is also yellow and red. The route markers for the Vietnam leg were similar to those used in A Corrida Milionária, the Brazilian version of The Amazing Race.

A majority of the legs in this season used tasks from The Amazing Race Asia. Tasks in Legs 1, 11, and 12 were from The Amazing Race Asia 4, while tasks in Legs 2 and 3 were from The Amazing Race Asia 3, and tasks in Leg 6 were from The Amazing Race Asia 2.

Casting
Application deadline for the first series closed on 17 September 2010 (extended from 6 September 2010) initially with the applicants required to be at least 18 years old with citizenship or permanent residency. However, due to insurance issues overseas, the minimum age for applicants was raised from 18 to 21 years of age.

Marketing
The Amazing Race Australia is sponsored by Canon, National Australia Bank, Honda, Vodafone and Gloria Jean's Coffees. The Amazing Race Australia also had an app for Android, iPhone and Blackberry where the user could track the teams and watch full episodes.

Cast

The cast included married fitness entrepreneurs, farmers, friends of Egyptian descent, models, Big W workmates and reunited sisters. Notably, Nathan, who teamed up with Tyler, is the boyfriend of 2006 Miss Australia, Erin McNaught. Renae was also the runner up of Miss Universe Australia 2010. Entrepreneurs Richard & Joey Marc are the authors of Please Mum, Don't Supersize Me! Ryot & Liberty are the brother and sister of the comedian Rebel Wilson.

Dating couple Chris & Anastasia have since split up, although they deny that their relationship was negatively affected by television exposure.

Future appearances 
Nathan Joliffe later competed on the second season of The Celebrity Apprentice Australia on the Nine Network, in which he came second losing to music guru Ian "Dicko" Dickson. In the final challenge, he raised $80,000 for his charity Epilepsy Australia.

Richard & Joey had a television show on Foxtel called Feel Good TV.

After this season, Mel Greig replaced Maude Garrett as a co-host of the Hot30 Countdown on the Today Radio Network, where she later gained international notoriety for her role in a controversial prank call to an English hospital, which was treating Catherine, Duchess of Cambridge for morning sickness. Subsequently, she also appeared on the fourth season of The Celebrity Apprentice Australia. She was eliminated in episode 8 and raised $10,000 for Endometriosis Australia.

Mo El-Leissy had a role on a Muslim sketch comedy show on SBS called Legally Brown.

In 2019, Sam Schoers competed in the sixth season of Australian Survivor. She was eliminated on Day 16 and finished in 18th place.

Results
The following teams participated in the season, each listed along with their placements in each leg. Note that this table is not necessarily reflective of all content broadcast on television due to inclusion or exclusion of some data. Placements are listed in finishing order.

A  placement with a dagger indicates that the team was eliminated.
An  placement with a double-dagger indicates that the team was the last to arrive at a pit stop in a non-elimination leg, and was "marked for elimination" in the following leg.
 An italicised and underlined placement indicates that the team was the last to arrive at a pit stop, but there was no rest period at the pit stop and all teams were instructed to continue racing.
A  indicates that the team won the Fast Forward. 
 A  indicates that the team used an Express Pass on that leg to bypass one of their tasks.
 A  indicates that the team used a U-Turn and a  indicates the team on the receiving end of a U-Turn. 
A  indicates that the teams encountered an Intersection.

 Notes

Prizes
The prize for each leg, with the exception of Leg 7, was awarded to the first place team for that leg.
Leg 1 – 10,000 from National Australia Bank and the Express Pass – an item that can be used to skip any one task of the team's choosing.
Leg 2 – Two tickets to the 2011 AFL Grand Final at the Melbourne Cricket Ground and a VIP tour of the National Sports Museum.
Leg 3 – A$10,000 from National Australia Bank.
Leg 4 – A$5,000 shopping spree at Kathmandu.
Leg 5 – A$5,000 home entertainment system from Bing Lee.
Leg 6 – A$5,000 shopping spree at Kathmandu.
Leg 8 – A$10,000 from National Australia Bank.
Leg 9 – A$5,000 personal computer package from Bing Lee.
Leg 10 – A$10,000 from National Australia Bank.
Leg 11 – A$5,000 home entertainment system from Bing Lee.
Leg 12 – A$250,000

Race summary

Leg 1 (Australia → Indonesia)

Airdate: 16 May 2011
Melbourne, Victoria, Australia (East Melbourne – Melbourne Cricket Ground) (Starting Line) 
 Melbourne (Melbourne Airport) to Denpasar, Bali, Indonesia (Ngurah Rai International Airport)
 Denpasar (BlueWater Express) to Mataram, Lombok (Tandjoengkarang Fishing Village)
Lingsar (Pura Lingsar)
 Mataram (Mandalika Market)
 Malaka (Malimbu Beach) to Gili Trawangan (Main Beach)
Gili Trawangan (Halik Reef)
Gili Trawangan (Sunset Point) 

In this series' first Roadblock at the Melbourne Cricket Ground, one team member had to scale  up one of the six light towers, retrieve their next clue, and abseil to their partner.

This series's first Detour was a choice between Cash or Carry. In Cash, teams had to make and sell 15 bowls of bakso for no less than Rp 5,000 per bowl before exchanging their earnings with the stall owner for their next clue. In Carry, both team members had to carry a basket of produce on their heads from one market stall to another without dropping the baskets to receive their next clue.

Additional tasks
At BlueWater Express, teams had to sign up for one of three boats leaving for Lombok. The first boat, which left at 6:00 a.m, had room for the first three teams, while the remaining boats, leaving in 30-minute intervals after the first boat, would carry four teams each. 
At Tandjoengkarang Fishing Village, teams had to search for their next clue, which was hidden under the nets of a fishing boat on Mapak Beach.
At Pura Lingsar Temple, teams had to run through a rice cake war ritual called perang topat, where they were pelted with rice cakes and powder by locals, to retrieve their next clue.
From Malimbu Beach, teams had to ride an outrigger to Gili Trawangan. Once there, both team members had to don snorkelling gear and swim to Halik Reef, where one member had to retrieve a briefcase from the reef. After returning a beach hut on shore, teams had to correctly count the money in the briefcase, where totals varied from team to team, to receive their next clue instructing them to travel by a horse-drawn carriage called a cidomo to the Pit Stop.

Leg 2 (Indonesia → Vietnam)

Airdate: 23 May 2011
Mataram (Tandjoengkarang Fishing Village) (Pit Start)
 Mataram (Selaparang Airport) or Denpasar (Ngurah Rai International Airport) to Ho Chi Minh City, Vietnam (Tan Son Nhat International Airport)
Ho Chi Minh City (Saigon Opera House)
 Ho Chi Minh City (Tan Son Nhat International Airport) to Huế (Phu Bai International Airport)
Huế (Trần Thanh Mại Garage) 
 Huế (Bằng Chicken Farm or Rice Paddy Field)
Hương Thủy (Khải Định Tomb) 
 Hương Trà (Minh Mạng Tomb) and Hương Thủy (Khải Định Tomb)
Huế (Huế Citadel) 

This leg's Detour was a choice between Carry Fowl or Carabao. In Carry Fowl, teams had to travel to Bằng Chicken Farm, where they had to gather 20 live chickens and carry them in đòn gánhs to a marked stall at a nearby market to receive their next clue. In Carabao, teams had to travel to a rice paddy, where they would use a water buffalo-drawn plow to till the soil until the plow caught on a buried rope attached to an Amazing Race flag, which they could exchange for their next clue.

In this leg's Roadblock, one team member had to retrieve seven coins representing the seven emperors of the Nguyễn dynasty at Minh Mạng Tomb then bring them back to Khải Định Tomb, where they would find out that they had to place the coins in the correct order of the reign of the emperors to receive their next clue. Each table with a coin at Minh Mạng Tomb also had information about the reigns of the corresponding emperor, and racers could return to the tomb to obtain this information.

Additional tasks
Outside the Saigon Opera House, teams had to search amongst hundreds of women wearing nón lás to find the woman that had their team name written on her fan, which they could exchange for their next clue.
At Trần Thanh Mại Garage, teams had to change the two rear tyres and motor oil of a marked ex-army jeep to receive their next clue. Teams would then use the jeep as their transportation for the rest of the leg.

Additional note
At the start of the leg, teams could either take a fast boat back to Denpasar to take a flight to Ho Chi Minh City or take a flight directly from the island of Lombok.

Leg 3 (Vietnam → Hong Kong → Macau)

Airdate: 30 May 2011
 Huế (Phu Bai International Airport) to Chek Lap Kok, Hong Kong, China (Hong Kong International Airport)
 Southern District (Aberdeen Marina Club  to Aberdeen Harbour – Jumbo Floating Restaurant)
Eastern District (Tin Hau Temple) 
 Kowloon City District (Kowloon Walled City Park)
 Central and Western District (Hong Kong–Macau Ferry Terminal) to Freguesia da Sé, Macau (Outer Harbour Ferry Terminal)
Zona do Aterro de Cotai (The Venetian Macao)
Freguesia de São Francisco Xavier (A Ma Cultural Village)  

This season's only Fast Forward required one team to perform a ritual that Buddhist monks and nuns usually perform for spiritual growth: completely shaving their heads. Once both team members' hair was cut, they would win the Fast Forward award. Richard & Joey won the Fast Forward.

This leg's Detour was a choice between Lion Dance or Kung Fu Stance. For both Detour options, teams had to travel to Kowloon Walled City Park. In Lion Dance, teams had to dress up and perform a traditional lion dance to the lion dance master's satisfaction to receive their next clue. In Kung Fu Stance, teams had to perform a series of precise kung fu moves to the kung fu master's satisfaction, then both team members had to break six clay tiles to receive their next clue.

In this leg's Roadblock, one team member had to arrange 12 paper lanterns depicting the animals of the Chinese zodiac in chronological order using clues given to them in their clue. Once the animals were in the correct order of Rat, Ox, Tiger, Rabbit, Dragon, Snake, Horse, Goat, Monkey, Rooster, Dog, and Pig, a gate would open allowing teams entrance to the Pit Stop. Sam & Renae used the Express Pass to bypass the Roadblock.

Additional tasks
At Jumbo Floating Restaurant, teams had to bite into over a thousand fortune cookies until they found one with a specific message inside telling them to receive their next clue from the waiter. 
After arriving in Macau by TurboJET, teams had to travel to The Venetian Macao, where they had to don formal wear before playing Baccarat with a dealer. Each time teams won a game, they would earn a Mahjong lettered tile, and after they won ten games, the titles would reveal their next location: A Ma Village.

Leg 4 (Macau → South Africa)

Airdate: 6 June 2011
Freguesia de Santo António (Ruins of Saint Paul's) (Pit Start)
 Freguesia de Nossa Senhora do Carmo (Macau International Airport) or Chek Lap Kok, Hong Kong (Hong Kong International Airport) to Port Elizabeth, South Africa (Port Elizabeth International Airport)
Graaff-Reinet (Camdeboo National Park – Valley of Desolation)
 Port Elizabeth (Kragga Kamma Game Park) 
 Garden Route National Park (Bloukrans Bridge)
Addo (Nomathamsanqa)
Addo (Addo Elephant National Park) 

This leg's Detour was a choice between Smash or Bash. For both Detour options, teams had to drive to Kragga Kamma Game Park. In Smash, teams had to throw a traditional South African club called a knobkerrie and shatter four suspended pots from a distance to receive their next clue. In Bash, teams had to build a large giraffe feeder, using only the tools and materials provided, to the satisfaction of the park ranger to receive their next clue.

Additional tasks
Upon arrival in Port Elizabeth, teams had to search the airport car park for a marked Toyota Hilux with a clue inside the windscreen that instructed teams to drive to Camdeboo National Park and search the Valley of Desolation for their next clue.
In Nomathamsanqa, teams had to find a goat pen, collect a goat and deliver it to a witch doctor known as a sangoma. Teams then had to pronounce a Xhosa phrase and receive a blessing from the sangoma before receiving their next clue.

Leg 5 (South Africa)

Airdate: 13 June 2011
 Port Elizabeth (Port Elizabeth International Airport) to Cape Town (Cape Town International Airport)
Cape Town (Dolphin Beach)
 Melkbosstrand (Melkboss Air Strip)
Cape Town (Victoria & Alfred Waterfront – Nobel Square) 
Cape Town (Kargo Warehouse)
Cape Town (Khayelitsha – Intyatyambo Orphanage)
 Paarl (Valley Gun Club or Nelson's Creek Wine Estate)
Atlantis (Atlantis Dunes)
Cape Town (Rhodes Memorial) 

In this leg's Roadblock, teams had to drive themselves to Melkboss Air Strip. The non-participating team member had to help guide their partner to the landing zone using signal flares. After team members reunited, the instructor would hand them their next clue.

This leg's Detour was a choice between Guns or Rosé. In Guns, teams had to shoot nine moving clay targets using a shotgun at the Valley Gun Club to receive their next clue. Team members had to alternate shooting after five shots. In Rosé, teams had to roll a large wine barrel across the Nelson's Creek Wine Estate to a winning station and completely fill the barrel with rosé to receive their next clue.

Additional tasks
At Nobel Square, teams encountered an Intersection, which required the two Intersected teams to load two trailers with toys and supplies at Kargo Warehouse and deliver them to Intyatyambo Orphanage. Once all the materials were delivered, the teams would receive their next clue and were no longer Intersected.
At Atlantis Dunes, teams had to drive quad bikes to an area filled with 15 overturned baskets. Underneath three baskets were teams' next clue while the rest contained hourglasses of varying sizes teams had to overturn and wait for the sand to run out before they could continue.

Leg 6 (South Africa → Netherlands → Czech Republic)

Airdate: 20 June 2011
 Cape Town (Cape Town International Airport) to Amsterdam, Netherlands (Amsterdam Airport Schiphol)
Amsterdam (Van Baerlestraat – Oud Hollands Gebakkraam )
 Amsterdam (Amsterdam Centraal Station) to Prague, Czech Republic (Praha Hlavní Nádraží)
Prague (Powder Tower)
Prague (Charles Bridge – Statue of St. Vitus)
 Prague (Old Town Square and Hotel U Prince or St. Agnes of Bohemia Convent and Kinský Palace)
 Prague (Střelecký Island)
Prague (Prague Castle) 

This leg's Detour was a choice between Chivalry or Delivery. In Chivalry, teams had to don knight's armour in Old Town Square and search for a Key Master, who would give them a key, by asking "Do you have a key to a damsel's heart?". They then had to search the square for a damsel in distress near the "Prince" (Hotel U Prince) and exchange the key for their next clue. In Delivery, teams had to carry a young princess in a royal sedan chair from the St. Agnes of Bohemia Convent to Kinský Palace to receive their next clue.

In this leg's Roadblock, teams had to travel to Střelecký Island and find a medieval village, where one team member had to hit a target on the archery range twice in 40 attempts to receive their next clue. If their arrow struck a bullseye, they would also receive a A$50 leg money bonus from National Australia Bank.

Additional tasks
At Oud Hollands Gebakkraa, each team member had to eat two appelbollen, a Belgian pastry popular in the Netherlands that is made out of a whole cored apple wrapped in puff pastry, to receive their next clue. The first four teams to finish their appelbollen would receive tickets for a sleeping car on a 15-hour train ride to Prague, Czech Republic, while the remaining three teams were given tickets for standard seats on a passenger car.
At the Powder Tower, teams had to search nearby for their clue, which instructed teams to search the Charles Bridge for a "holey" statue to find their next clue.

Leg 7 (Czech Republic)

Airdate: 27 June 2011
Prague (Dancing House)
Prague (Štvanice Stadium)
Prague (St. Nicolas Church)
 Plzeň (Pilsner Urquell Brewery or Formanka Restaurant)
Kutná Hora (Church of the Assumption of Our Lady and Saint John the Baptist) 
Kutná Hora (Church of Bones) 

This leg's Detour was a choice between Stack Up or Stack In. In Stack Up, teams went into the Pilsner Urquell Brewery, where they had to stack two pallets with cases with 45 Pilsner beer cartons each to receive their next clue. In Stack In, teams had to consume 18 traditional Czech sausages called játernice, which were made from pig offal, to receive their next clue.

In this leg's Roadblock, one team member had to climb to the top of the church then abseil down to the church floor, with the church choir's singing accompanying them on the way down, to receive their next clue from a priest.

Additional tasks
At the Dancing House, teams had to search nearby for a 1982 Škoda sedan, which contained their next clue and would be their only means of transportation while in the Czech Republic.
At Štvanice Stadium, teams had to score one goal against a Czech national hockey team goaltender to receive their next clue.
At St. Nicolas Church, teams had to collect cameras and climb to the top of the cathedral tower 304 steps high to a former Soviet Spy post, whereupon they had 30 seconds to locate and photograph a man waving an Amazing Race flag, listed in the clue as a "flagged person of interest", and not the tout waving a flag advertising a local museum. If teams took a picture of the correct man, they received their next clue; otherwise, they had to return to the bottom of the tower and, whilst climbing back up, count the number of steps to receive their next clue. If teams gave an incorrect number, they had to climb up the steps again.

Leg 8 (Czech Republic → Poland)

Airdate: 4 July 2011
 Kutná Hora (Kutná Hora Hlavní Nádraží ) to Kraków, Poland (Kraków Główny Railway Station)
Kraków (Main Square) (Unaired)
 Wieliczka (Wieliczka Salt Mine)
 Zakopane (Polish Countryside or Karczma Czarci Jar Restaurant)
Czorsztyn (Cape Stylchen) 
Niedzica (Niedzica Castle) 

In this leg's Roadblock, one team member had to descend  into a salt mine and push a cart containing rock salt to the end of a mine shaft. They then had to dig through the cart to find crystal keys, one of which would unlock the salt king's crypt containing their next clue.

This leg's Detour was a choice between Herd or Hoe Down. In Herd, teams had to travel into the Polish countryside, where they had to build a pen using the provided fences and herd three sheep marked with a red stripe into it to receive their next clue from a shepherd. In Hoe Down, teams had to travel to Karczma Czarci Jar Restaurant, where they had to don Polish Highland clothing and learn and perform a Polish axe dance to the satisfaction of the village judge to receive their next clue.

Additional tasks
After arriving in Krakow, teams had to search the railway station car park for a marked Honda CR-Z along with their next clue on the vehicle's windshield. 
At Cape Stylchen, teams encountered an Intersection, where two members of the Intersected teams at a time had to cut four slices off of a large log using a two-man saw to receive their next clue. Teams had to swap the people sawing after each slice. After completing the task, teams were no longer Intersected.

Leg 9 (Poland → Israel)

Airdate: 11 July 2011
 Kraków (Kraków John Paul II International Airport) to Tel Aviv, Israel (Ben Gurion Airport)
Tel Aviv (Azrieli Center)
 Tel Aviv (Tel Aviv Savidor Central Railway Station) to Haifa (Haifa Center HaShmona Railway Station)
 Haifa (Port of Haifa)
Jaffa (Hasimta Theatre)
 Tel Aviv (Jerusalem Beach)
Southern District (Masada) 

In this leg's Roadblock, teams had to first travel by train to the Port of Haifa, where one team member had member to rig a container truck, drive it through an obstacle course, and reverse the containers into a loading space to receive their next clue.

This leg's Detour was a choice between Find Unseen or Make 13. For both Detour options, teams had to travel to Jerusalem Beach. In Find Unseen, teams had to use a metal detector to a search marked area for the one key that would unlock a chest containing their next clue. In Make 13, teams had to play matkot, a traditional Israeli bat and ball game similar to beach tennis. They had to hit a ball back and forth 13 times without letting it hit the ground to receive their next clue.

Additional tasks
At Azrieli Center, teams had to make their way to the helipad of the tallest of the three towers to find their next clue.
At Hasimta Theatre, one team member had to answer five questions, and their partner had to match the answers to receive their next clue.
{|class="wikitable" style="text-align:center"
|-
!rowspan=2|Questions
!colspan=5|Answers
|-
!Dave & Kelly
!Jeff & Luke
!Matt & Tom
!Sam & Renae
!Tyler & Nathan
|-
!Which team's relationship do you envy?
|Dave & Kelly
|Tyler & Nathan
|Jeff & Luke
|Tyler & Nathan
|Jeff & Luke
|-
!Which team would be first to lend you a helping hand?
|Sam & Renae
|Matt & Tom
|Jeff & Luke
|Anne-Marie & Tracy
|Chris & Anastasia
|-
!If the Race was a foursome player, which team would you pair up with?
|Alana & Mel
|Tyler & Nathan
|Jeff & Luke
|Tyler & Nathan
|Jeff & Luke
|-
!Which team has been the most strategic?
|Jeff & Luke
|Matt & Tom
|Tyler & Nathan
|Richard & Joey
|Richard & Joey
|-
!Apart from your own team, which team most deserves to win?
|Sam & Renae
|Tyler & Nathan
|Jeff & Luke
|Matt & Tom
|Sam & Renae
|-
|}
After the Detour, teams had to find a marked Honda Civic and drive themselves to the ancient Masada ruins to check into the Pit Stop.

Addititonal note
Dave & Kelly failed to reach the Masada pit stop. After all other teams had already checked in at the pit stop, Grant came out to their location to inform them of their elimination.

Leg 10 (Israel)

Airdate: 18 July 2011
 Southern District (Masada – Winter Palace of King Herod)
Kalya, West Bank (Qumran) 
Jerusalem (Central Post Office Building)
 Jerusalem (Old City – Via Dolorosa and Church of the Holy Sepulchre or Western Wall and City of David)
Jerusalem (Dung Gate)
Jerusalem (Aish HaTorah World Centre) 

In this leg's Roadblock, one team member had to translate a Hebrew message written from right-to-left on a scroll resembling the Dead Sea Scrolls using a translation guide and then transcribe the message left-to-right to receive their next clue.

This leg's Detour involving religious aspects of the Holy City and was a choice between Pilgrim's Trail or Holy Grail. In Pilgrim's Trail, teams had to travel to the Old City, pick up an  wooden cross and carry it along the Via Dolorosa passing by the nine Stations of the Cross, the path Jesus is said to have taken along to the site of his crucifixion, to the Church of the Holy Sepulchre to receive their next clue. In Holy Grail, teams had to travel to the Western Wall and enter an active archaeological dig site in the Kotel Tunnels. There, teams had to unearth a clay pot and then walk through the tunnels to deliver it to an archaeologist in the City of David to receive their next clue.

Additional tasks
At the start of the leg, teams had to take a cable car up to the ruins to find the Winter Palace of King Herod, where they would find their next clue, instructing them to drive to site where the Dead Sea Scrolls were discovered to find their next clue.
During the Pit Stop, teams recorded messages to their loved ones at home and had to hold onto the memory cards until they reached the Central Post Office Building, where they had to mail their record messages home to receive their next clue. 
After the Detour, teams had to walk along the Rampart Walk near Dung Gate to find their next clue.

Leg 11 (Israel → Sri Lanka)

Airdate: 25 July 2011
Jerusalem (Dung Gate) (Pit Start)
 Tel Aviv (Ben Gurion Airport) to Colombo, Sri Lanka (Bandaranaike International Airport)
Colombo (Gangaramaya Temple)
 Colombo (Pettah – St. John's Fish Market)
 Colombo (Fort Railway Station) to Galle (Galle Railway Station)
Galle (Galle Fort)
 Galle (Galle Bus Station) to Ambalangoda (Ambalangoda Train Station – Mask Stall Vendor)
 Nugegoda (Trendy Connections Garment Factory)
Colombo (Independence Square) 

This leg's Detour was a choice between Count or Carry. In Count, teams had to find a marked stall with a basket full of fish and correctly count the number of fish to receive their next clue. In Carry, teams had to use a wooden trolley to transfer 15 blocks of unbroken ice through a busy market to a marked stall to receive their next clue.

In this leg's Roadblock, one team member had to use an industrial sewing machine to properly sew fabric cuttings into a shirt to receive their next clue.

Additional tasks
At Gangaramaya Temple, teams had to receive a blessing from a monk before receiving their next clue.
After the Detour, teams had to travel by third class train to Galle then make their way to Galle Fort to find their next clue.
At Galle Fort, teams had to unlock a chest with the year Sri Lanka gained independence from the United Kingdom: 1948. Inside the chest was a clue that asked for the year of birth of Sri Lanka's first Prime Minister D. S. Senanayake: 1884, to open a second chest containing their next clue.
At Ambalangoda Train Station, teams had to find a mask stall vendor. There, teams had to memorize a mask and then search a nearby street festival for a person wearing a matching mask to receive their next clue.

Additional note
Jeff & Luke bought 2nd class tickets on the train to Galle, when the clue instructed them to purchase 3rd class tickets. For this, they incurred a 10-minute penalty before leaving Galle Station.

Leg 12 (Sri Lanka → Singapore → Australia)

Airdate: 1 August 2011
 Colombo (Bandaranaike International Airport) to Singapore (Changi Airport)
Singapore (Goh Chor Tua Pek Kong Chinese Temple)
 Singapore (Marina Bay Sands)
Singapore (Hong San See Taoist Temple)
Singapore (Jurong Chinese Gardens)
Singapore (Singapore Flyer)
 Singapore (Changi Airport) to Perth, Western Australia, Australia (Perth Airport)
Perth (City Centre – Kings Park Overlook)
Fremantle (Fremantle Prison)
Rockingham (Cape Peron) 
Perth (Heirisson Island) 

This season's final Detour at Marina Bay Sands was a choice between Dare or Stair. In Dare, teams had to take an elevator to the 55th floor of Tower 1. There, both team members had to traverse a tightrope to Tower 2 and back to receive their clue. In Stair, teams had to climb the stairs up to the 55th floor of Tower 1, collect a Singaporean plush toy souvenir, climbs the stairs back down, and then climb the stairs of Tower 2 to the 56th floor, where they could exchange the souvenir for their next clue.

In this season's final Roadblock, one team member had to pick out 12 flags out of a basket of 16, with the flags of the Philippines, Morocco, Vanuatu, and Greenland as decoys, and arrange the flags of the countries they visited during the season in chronological order: Australia, Indonesia, Vietnam, China, South Africa, Netherlands, Czech Republic, Poland, Israel, Sri Lanka, Singapore, and Australia. Once all flags were in the correct order, teams would receive their final clue from a geography professor.

Additional tasks
At Goh Chor Tua Pek Kong Chinese Temple, teams had to break open durians and until they found one with red coloured flesh inside to receive their next clue from a Chinese opera troupe.
At Hong San See Taoist Temple, teams had to participate in a five-minute palm reading from a fortune teller before receiving their next clue.
At Jurong Chinese Gardens, teams had to search for a statue of Confucius that would lead them to their next clue.
At the Singapore Flyer, teams had to choose one of the 28 Ferris wheel capsules and read the envelope inside. Only three capsules contained their next clue while the rest contained envelops that told teams to try again. If teams picked an incorrect capsule, they had to wait out a 21-minute rotation before they could attempt another pick.
At Fremantle Prison, teams would be given 12 keys that they had to use to search the cells of the prison until they found a cell with their next clue. Teams had to lock each door they opened before they could continue searching.

Episode title quotes
Episode titles are often taken from quotes made by the racers.

"Nothing's Smooth Sailing with Us" – Tracy
"Like Four Seasons in a Day" – Chris
"We've Got Pain, But We've Not Lost Any Weight" – Anne-Marie
"A Town That Was 15-20 Letters Long" – Nathan
"The Woman-ness to Realize Where You Went Wrong" – Chris
"The Last Team Will Spend the Night in the Dungeon" – Last Clue (Paraphrased)
"It's Just Like Where's Wally" – Tom
"At Least the View's Nice" – Chris
"When I Saw Everyone Freezing to Death" – Kelly
"I Hope We Don't Have to Wear a Crown of Thorns" – Tom
"You the Nice Cowboy" – Israeli Taxi Driver to Matt & Tom
"You're Good at Spending Money" – Tyler & Nathan's Fortune Teller, in Mandarin Chinese, through a translator

Ratings

Notes

References

External links
Official website

Australia 1
2011 Australian television seasons
Television shows filmed in Australia
Television shows filmed in Indonesia
Television shows filmed in Vietnam
Television shows filmed in Hong Kong
Television shows filmed in Macau
Television shows filmed in South Africa
Television shows filmed in the Netherlands
Television shows filmed in the Czech Republic
Television shows filmed in Poland
Television shows filmed in Israel
Television shows filmed in Jordan
Television shows filmed in Italy
Television shows filmed in Sri Lanka
Television shows filmed in Singapore